The BSA B31 is a motorcycle that was produced by Birmingham Small Arms Company.

The BSA B31, introduced in 1945, was the first new model introduced by the company after the Second World War. Based on pre-war designs, it used a single cylinder four stroke engine that displaced . Initially, it had a rigid frame and telescopic forks, the first use of such on a BSA. It was immediately popular and was soon joined by a  version, the BSA B33 and competition equivalents, the BSA B32 and BSA B34; the side-car versions, with stiffer suspension and different final demultiplication, were known as BB31 and BB33.

Plunger rear suspension was offered later, with a swingarm rear suspension frame available from 1954. The model continued in production until 1959, by which time the traditional Lucas magdyno had been replaced by an alternator and coil ignition.

The B series expanded through its life to include the famous BSA Gold Stars, and the bottom half of all engines has much in common with the M series side valve models. The M33, designed for sidecar work, combined the strong M series frame and the better-performing B33 500 cc overhead valve engine.

See also
List of motorcycles of the 1940s

B31
Motorcycles introduced in the 1940s
Single-cylinder motorcycles